The Mississippi Department of Environmental Quality (MDEQ) is a state agency of Mississippi that oversees environmental quality of the air, land, and water in the state. Its headquarters are in Jackson.

Regional offices
 Central Regional Office (unincorporated Rankin County, near Pearl)
 North Regional Office (unincorporated Lafayette County, near Oxford)
 South Regional Office (Bolton State Office Building, Biloxi)

References

External links

 Mississippi Department of Environmental Quality

State agencies of Mississippi
State environmental protection agencies of the United States